Ali Mohamed Bujsaim (born September 9, 1959 in Dubai) is a retired association football referee from the United Arab Emirates, who is best known for supervising matches at three FIFA World Cups: 1994 (two matches), 1998 (three matches) and 2002 (two matches).

References

External links 
 
 
 

1959 births
Living people
Emirati football referees
2002 FIFA World Cup referees
1998 FIFA World Cup referees
1994 FIFA World Cup referees
CONCACAF Gold Cup referees
Olympic football referees
AFC Asian Cup referees
Major League Soccer referees